The genus Saproamanita contains about 24 species of agarics and is one of six genera in the family Amanitaceae. The others are Amanita (which now includes the synonym Torrendia, a generic name previously applied to sequestrate species), Catatrama, Limacellopsis, Zhuliangomyces and Limacella. Saproamanita are the saprophytic species in the Tribe Amaniteae, separately classified from the ectomycorrhizal species in the genus Amanita.

Saproamanita resemble Amanita and have a pileus, free lamellae, a central stipe, and an annulus with scales and rings below the annulus that are the remnants of the universal veil composed largely of cylindrical to slender clavate inflated hyphal cells mostly scattered in the central stipe region rather than the base. The spores are white and amyloid. DNA molecular evidence for the separation of the saprotrophic genus from the sister genus of symbiotic genus Amanita was first detected in a study of mushrooms and their families in 2002 when Saproamanita armillariiformis [under the name Amanita armillariiformis] appeared basal to Amanita. Later studies supported by larger samplings of species and additional gene regions in investigations of the family Amanitaceae expanded the sampling of both groups of species that were all considered to be Amanita species or separated into two genera under the names Aspidella and Amanita. In that most detailed study of decomposition pathway enzymes that lends support for taxonomic separation, the subgeneric name Amanita subgen. Lepidella was misapplied to a group of species that did not include the type species of the subgenus. That subgeneric group of mycorrhizal species is more correctly named Amanita subgen. Amanitina and not subgen. Lepidella.

Saproamanita are known to inhabit grasslands, lawns, pastures, fens, and fields in Africa, Asia including the Indian subcontinent and Thailand, Australia, Europe, including Mediterranean islands (e.g.  Cyprus) and England, North America, including Mexico, the Caribbean, and South America, as well as glens in open canopy forests. Some species are known to form fairy rings. At least three of the species are invasive species expanding their ranges, S. inopinata in Europe, S. thiersii in North America, and S. manicata in Hawaii.

In Mexico, one species, S. thiersii is reportedly regularly harvested for food and is named in Spanish, "hongos de neblina". In 2019, an amateur mycologist, Denis Pouclet, experimentally ate 30 grams, fresh weight, of S. vittadinii from France without reported adverse symptoms.

Taxonomy
The name refers to the saprotrophic life style and the generic relationship to its sister genus Amanita. In earlier studies the genus was ill-defined and named Lepidella and later Aspidella. Both of these names are unusable because of earlier usage by biologists for other organisms, e.g. Aspidella E. Billings. The most recent adoption of the name Aspidella was based on a molecularly and ecologically defined genus similar to the current circumscription.

Currently there are two competing contemporary classifications, one that recognizes the two genera, Amanita and Saproamanita, and the other that maintains both genera under the older name Amanita.

A recent phylogenetic tree for the genus included information from Thailand by Nakarin Suwannarach and Surapong Khuna.

Genome sequencing
The genome of Saproamanita thiersii (as Amanita thiersii) and its cellulose degrading capability are the subject of a US Department of Energy, Joint Genome Institute project.

Species

Saproamanita ameghinoi
Saproamanita armillariiformis
Saproamanita codinae
Saproamanita flavofloccosa
Saproamanita foetidissima
Saproamanita grallipes
Saproamanita inopinata
Saproamanita lilloi
Saproamanita manicata
Saproamanita nana
Saproamanita nauseosa
Saproamanita pleropus
Saproamanita praeclara
Saproamanita praegraveolens
Saproamanita prairiicola
Saproamanita pruittii
Saproamanita quitensis
Saproamanita roseolescens
Saproamanita savannae
Saproamanita silvifuga
Saproamanita singeri
Saproamanita subcaligata
Saproamanita thiersii
Saproamanita vittadinii

References

External links

Saproamanita foetidissima
Saproamanita inopinata
Saproamanita manicata
Saproamanita manicata
Saproamanita praeclara
Saproamanita praegraveolens
Saproamanita singeri
Saproamanita subcaligata
Saproamanita subcaligata
Saproamanita thiersii
Saproamanita vittadinii
Saproamanita vittadinii

Amanitaceae
Agaricales genera